The counties and areas for the purposes of the lieutenancies, also referred to as the lieutenancy areas of England and informally known as ceremonial counties, are areas of England to which lords-lieutenant are appointed. Legally, the areas in England, as well as in Wales and Scotland, are defined by the Lieutenancies Act 1997 as "counties and areas for the purposes of the lieutenancies in Great Britain", in contrast to the areas used for local government. They are also informally known as "geographic counties", to distinguish them from other types of counties of England.

History 

The distinction between a county for purposes of the lieutenancy and a county for administrative purposes is not a new one; in some cases, a county corporate that was part of a county appointed its own lieutenant (although the lieutenant of the containing county would often be appointed to this position, as well), and the three Ridings of Yorkshire had been treated as three counties for lieutenancy purposes since the 17th century.

The Local Government Act 1888 established county councils to assume the administrative functions of quarter sessions in the counties. It created new entities called "administrative counties". An administrative county comprised all of the county apart from the county boroughs; also, some traditional subdivisions of counties were constituted administrative counties, for instance the Soke of Peterborough in Northamptonshire and the Isle of Ely in Cambridgeshire. The act further stipulated that areas that were part of an administrative county would be part of the county for all purposes. The greatest change was the creation of the County of London, which was made both an administrative county and a "county"; it included parts of the historic counties of Middlesex, Kent, and Surrey. Other differences were small and resulted from the constraint that urban sanitary districts (and later urban districts and municipal boroughs) were not permitted to straddle county boundaries.

Apart from Yorkshire, counties that were subdivided nevertheless continued to exist as ceremonial counties. For example, the administrative counties of East Suffolk and West Suffolk, along with the county borough of Ipswich, were considered to make up a single ceremonial county of Suffolk, and the administrative county of the Isle of Wight was part of the ceremonial county of Hampshire.

The term "ceremonial county" is an anachronism; at the time they were shown on Ordnance Survey maps as "counties" or "geographical counties", and were referred to in the Local Government Act 1888 simply as "counties".

Apart from minor boundary revisions (for example, Caversham, a town in Oxfordshire, becoming part of Reading county borough and thus of Berkshire, in 1911), these areas changed little until the 1965 creation of Greater London and of Huntingdon and Peterborough, which resulted in the abolition of the offices of Lord Lieutenant of Middlesex, Lord Lieutenant of the County of London, and Lord Lieutenant of Huntingdonshire and the creation of the Lord Lieutenant of Greater London and of the Lord Lieutenant of Huntingdon and Peterborough.

In 1974, administrative counties and county boroughs were abolished, and a major reform was instituted. At this time, lieutenancy was redefined to use the new metropolitan and nonmetropolitan counties directly.

Following a further rearrangement in 1996, Avon, Cleveland, Hereford and Worcester, and Humberside were abolished. This led to a resurrection of a distinction between the local government counties and the ceremonial or geographical counties used for lieutenancy, and also to the adoption of the term "ceremonial counties", which although not used in statute, was used in the House of Commons before the arrangements coming into effect.

The County of Avon that had been formed in 1974 was mostly split between Gloucestershire and Somerset, but its city of Bristol regained the status of a county in itself, which it had lost upon the formation of Avon. Cleveland was partitioned between North Yorkshire and Durham. Hereford and Worcester was divided into the restored counties of Herefordshire and Worcestershire. Humberside was split between Lincolnshire and a new ceremonial county of East Riding of Yorkshire. Rutland was restored as a ceremonial county. Many county boroughs were re-established as unitary authorities; this involved establishing the area as an administrative county, but usually not as a ceremonial county.

Most ceremonial counties are, therefore, entities comprising local authority areas, as they were from 1889 to 1974. The Association of British Counties, a traditional counties lobbying organisation, has suggested that ceremonial counties be restored to their ancient boundaries.

Shrieval counties 
The shrieval counties are defined by the Sheriffs Act 1887 as amended, in a similar way to the lieutenancies defined by the Lieutenancies Act 1997. Each has a high sheriff appointed (except the City of London, which has two sheriffs).

Definition 
The Lieutenancies Act 1997 defines counties for the purposes of lieutenancies in terms of metropolitan and non-metropolitan counties (created by the Local Government Act 1972, as amended) as well as Greater London and the Isles of Scilly (which lie outside the 1972 Act's new system). Although the term is not used in the act, these counties are sometimes known as "ceremonial counties". The counties are defined in Schedule 1, paragraphs 2–5 as amended (most recently in 2009 and 2019) — these amendments have not altered the actual areas covered by the counties as set out in 1997, only their composition in terms of local government areas, as a result of structural changes in local government.

Lieutenancy areas since 1997 
These are the 48 counties for the purposes of the lieutenancies in England, as currently defined:

Lieutenancy areas in 1890 

 Bedfordshire
 Berkshire
 Buckinghamshire
 Cambridgeshire, including Isle of Ely
 Cheshire
 held jointly with Chester
 Cornwall
 Cumberland
 Derbyshire
 Devon
 held jointly with Exeter
 Dorset
 held jointly with Poole
 Durham
 Essex
 Gloucestershire
 held jointly with Gloucester and Bristol
 Hampshire
 held jointly with Southampton
 Herefordshire
 Hertfordshire
 Huntingdonshire
 Kent
 held jointly with Canterbury
 Lancashire
 Leicestershire
 Lincolnshire
 held jointly with Lincoln
 City of London, having commissioners of Lieutenancy
 County of London
 Middlesex
 Norfolk
 held jointly with Norwich
 Northamptonshire, including the Soke of Peterborough
 Northumberland
 held jointly with Berwick-upon-Tweed and Newcastle upon Tyne
 Nottinghamshire
 held jointly with Nottingham
 Oxfordshire
 Rutland
 Shropshire
 Somerset
 Staffordshire
 held jointly with Lichfield
 Suffolk
 Surrey
 Sussex
 Warwickshire
 Westmorland
 Wiltshire
 Worcestershire
 held jointly with Worcester
 Yorkshire—had three Lieutenants, one for each of the three ridings
 East Riding, held jointly with Kingston upon Hull
 North Riding
 West Riding, held jointly with York

See also 

 Counties of England
 Historic counties of England
 Counties in England by population
 Lieutenancy areas of Scotland
 List of local governments in the United Kingdom
 Nomenclature of Territorial Units for Statistics
 Preserved counties of Wales

Notes

References

External links 
 

 
England-related lists
Counties of England